Hovin is a village in the municipality of Melhus in Trøndelag county, Norway.  It is located along the river Gaula between the villages of Støren and Lundamo.  Hovin has several distinct terraces in the hillsides, which are remnants of old shorelines following the end of the ice age.

The European route E06 highway runs north–south through the village.  The Dovrebanen railway line also runs north–south through Hovin. Hovin Station is located in the village along the railway line, but only used for local traffic. The Gulfoss Tunnel is a railway tunnel that runs under a large residential area in Hovin.

References

Villages in Trøndelag
Melhus